Detective Investigation Files III is a 1997 TVB production. It was a direct sequel to Detective Investigation Files II and the third installment in the Detective Investigation Files Series. The series ran for 40 episodes. Only Michael Tao, Joey Leung and Kenix Kwok returned to reprise their roles from the previous two installments. Louisa So, Amy Kwok, Joseph Lee and Sammi Cheng did not participate in this series; instead they were replaced by Margaret Chung, Law Koon Lan, Liu Kai-chi, Monica Chan and Winnie Yeung who portrayed new characters. This installment featured 10 cases.

Cast

Main Cast

Cases

Case 1: The Other Jessie (Episode 1–5)

Case 2: Rape and Revenge (Episode 6–9)

Case 3: Unexpected Murderer (Episode 10–12)

Case 4: Love-hate Struggle (Episode 13–15)

Case 5: Butterfly Triggers (Episode 16–18)

Case 6: A Furious Affair (Episode 19–23)

Case 7: Now You See Me, Now You Don't (Episode 24–27)

Case 8: The Charlatan Murders (Episode 28–31)

Case 9: The Precious Stone (Episode 32–37)

Case 10: Backstage Manipulator (Episode 37–40)

See also
 Detective Investigation Files Series

External links
無綫電視官方網頁（TVBI） – 刑事偵緝檔案III

TVB dramas
TVB
1997 Hong Kong television series debuts
1997 Hong Kong television series endings